Betty Co-Ed is a 1946 American musical comedy film starring Jean Porter, directed by Arthur Dreifuss and produced by Sam Katzman.

Plot
Vaudeville is in Joanne Leeds's blood, but when she applies for admission at prestigious Upton College, she is accepted because it is mistakenly believed she hails from a prominent family.

A rivalry begins immediately with campus co-ed Gloria Campbell, who resents boyfriend Bill Brewster's interest in the new girl. Joanne is humiliated by Gloria during a college pledge party. Attending a school dance by herself, Joanne joins the singers on stage and impresses Bill and other students.

Deciding to run for the title of "Betty Co-Ed", most popular girl on campus, Joanne is crossed again by Gloria, who stuffs the ballot box to make it appear Joanne has rigged the vote. Faced with expulsion, Joanne delivers a speech that causes Gloria to develop a guilty conscience and apologize.

Cast
Jean Porter as Joanne Leeds 
Shirley Mills as Gloria Campbell 
Jackie Moran as Ted Harris
William Mason as Bill Brewster

Production
The film was based on a story by Erna Lazarus which Columbia Pictures bought in 1945. They assigned it to Sam Katzman, who made it for his production company, Kay Pictures, who released through Columbia. Porter was borrowed from MGM to play the lead. She wound up making a number of movies for Katzman.

References

External links

Betty Co-Ed at TCMDB
Review of film at Variety

1940s American films
1940s English-language films
1946 films
1946 musical comedy films
American black-and-white films
American coming-of-age films
American musical comedy films
Columbia Pictures films
Films directed by Arthur Dreifuss
Films set in universities and colleges
Films with screenplays by George H. Plympton